Ehsan Pahlevan (born 25 July 1993) is an Iranian professional footballer who plays as a wide midfielder for Persian Gulf Pro League club Foolad.

Club career

Zob Ahan
He joined Zob Ahan in the winter break of 2012–13 Season on loan from Gostaresh until the end of the season. At the end of the season, his transfer completed and he joined Zob Ahan officially.

Sepahan
On 12 January 2014, Zob Ahan accepted a bid to loan Pahlavan to Sepahan until the end of the season. He joined Sepahan on the following day, where he played one league match and one Hazfi Cup match. At the end of the season, he returned to Zob Ahan.

Persepolis 

On 2 September 2020, Pahlavan signed a two-year contract with Persian Gulf Pro League champions Persepolis.

Club career statistics

 Assist Goals

International career

U20
He is part of Iran U–20 during 2012 AFC U-19 Championship qualification, 2012 CIS Cup, 2012 AFF U-19 Youth Championship and 2012 AFC U-19 Championship.

U23
He invited to Iran U-23 training camp by Nelo Vingada to preparation for Incheon 2014 and 2016 AFC U-22 Championship (Summer Olympic qualification). He named in Iran U23 final list for Incheon 2014.

Senior
Pahlavan was called up to the senior Iran squad by Carlos Queiroz for friendlies against Macedonia and Kyrgyzstan in June 2016. He made his debut against Montenegro on 4 June 2017.

Honours

Club
Zob Ahan
Hazfi Cup (2): 2014–15, 2015–16
Iranian Super Cup (1): 2016

Persepolis
Persian Gulf Pro League (1): 2020–21
Iranian Super Cup (1): 2020 ; Runner-up (1): 2021
AFC Champions League Runner-up (1): 2020

Individual 
Awards

 Fans' Asian Champions League XI: 2016

References

External links
 Ehsan Pahlavan at eurosport
 Ehsan Pahlavan at Fmdataba
 
 Ehsan Pahlavan at PersianLeague.com
 
 

1993 births
Living people
People from Bojnord
Iranian footballers
Association football wingers
Gostaresh Foulad F.C. players
Zob Ahan Esfahan F.C. players
Sepahan S.C. footballers
Tractor S.C. players
Azadegan League players
Persian Gulf Pro League players
Iran under-20 international footballers
Footballers at the 2014 Asian Games
Asian Games competitors for Iran
Persepolis F.C. players